Leesburg is a city in Lee County, Georgia, United States. The population was 3,480 at the 2020 census, up from 2,896 at the 2010 census. The city is the county seat of Lee County and is part of the Albany, Georgia Metropolitan Statistical Area.

History
Leesburg, originally known as "Wooten Station", was founded in 1870 as the Central of Georgia Railway arrived in the area. In 1872, the town was renamed "Wooten", and the seat was transferred from Starksville. In 1874, the town was incorporated and renamed again to its present form of Leesburg.

Leesburg is the site of the Leesburg Stockade incident, in which a group of African-American teenage and pre-teen girls were arrested for protesting racial segregation in Americus, Georgia, and were imprisoned without charges for 45 days in poor conditions in the Lee County Public Works building.

Geography
Leesburg is in south-central Lee County. U.S. Route 19 passes through the city, leading north  to Americus and south  to Albany. State Route 32 is Leesburg's Main Street; it leads east  to Ashburn and west  to Dawson. State Route 195 leads northeast from Leesburg  to Leslie.

Kinchafoonee Creek flows through a western corner of the city; it leads south to the Flint River, part of the Apalachicola River watershed.

Demographics

2020 census

As of the 2020 United States census, there were 3,480 people, 884 households, and 666 families residing in the city.

2000 census
As of the census of 2000, there were 2,633 people, 796 households, and 612 families residing in the city. The racial makeup of the city was 61.56% White, 36.42% African American, 0.30% Native American, 0.91% Asian, 0.08% from other races, and 0.72% from two or more races. Hispanic or Latino of any race were 0.84% of the population.

There were 796 households, out of which 49.0% had children under the age of 18 living with them, 47.1% were married couples living together, 26.4% had a female householder with no husband present, and 23.1% were non-families. 20.7% of all households were made up of individuals, and 7.8% had someone living alone who was 65 years of age or older.  The average household size was 2.81 and the average family size was 3.24.

In the city, the population was spread out, with 30.1% under the age of 18, 10.2% from 18 to 24, 34.3% from 25 to 44, 16.2% from 45 to 64, and 9.2% who were 65 years of age or older.  The median age was 30 years. For every 100 females, there were 104.9 males.  For every 100 females age 18 and over, there were 108.7 males.

The median income for a household in the city was $28,958, and the median income for a family was $33,487. Males had a median income of $30,862 versus $18,710 for females. The per capita income for the city was $13,690.  About 16.8% of families and 20.0% of the population were below the poverty line, including 31.4% of those under age 18 and 21.7% of those age 65 or over.

Education 

The Lee County School District holds pre-school to grade twelve, and consists of two primary schools, two elementary schools, two middle schools, and a high school. The district has 330 full-time teachers and over 5,350 students.
Kinchafoonee Primary School
Lee County Elementary School
Lee County Primary School
Twin Oaks Elementary
Lee County Middle School East Campus
Lee County Middle School West Campus
Lee County High School
Lee County High School 9th Grade Campus

Notable people
Hal Breeden, former Major League Baseball player, former sheriff of Lee County
Luke Bryan, country music artist
Tic Forrester, congressman
Roy Hamilton, singer of R&B, soul, show tunes and rock 'n' roll music
Carly Mathis, Miss Georgia 2013
Marion Motley, Pro Football Hall of Fame running back
Phillip Phillips, American Idol season 11 winner
Buster Posey, 2012 NL MVP San Francisco Giants catcher
Merritt Ranew, former Major League Baseball player

References

External links
Official website

Cities in Georgia (U.S. state)
Cities in Lee County, Georgia
County seats in Georgia (U.S. state)
Albany metropolitan area, Georgia